Zlata Bartl (Dolac, 20 February 1920 – Koprivnica, 30 July 2008) was a Bosnian Croat scientist and is the creator of Vegeta.

Bartl finished school in Sarajevo and went to Zagreb to study natural sciences, engineering, medicine and health, biotechnical sciences, social sciences, and humanities.

In 1955, she began working as a chemical technician in Podravka, Croatia. It was there in 1959 that she created Vegeta, which would become one of the most popular Croatian brands. She has since then received numerous recognitions and awards, including the Order of Danica Hrvatska.

There is a scholarship foundation set up in her name for graduate students studying science in Zagreb.

References

External links
 Prof Zlata Bartl Foundation official website
 "Samozatajna teta Vegeta stvorila Vegetu", a news article

Croatian inventors
1920 births
2008 deaths
People from Travnik
Croats of Bosnia and Herzegovina
Faculty of Science, University of Zagreb alumni
Yugoslav inventors
Yugoslav scientists
Economy of Koprivnica